George Leland Dyer (August 26, 1849 in Calais, Maine – April 2, 1914 in Winter Park, Florida) was an American naval commander and the Governor of U.S. territory of Guam. In 1870, he graduated from the United States Naval Academy with honors and began his career in the United States Navy.

From 1904–1905, he served as Governor of Guam.

In 1908, he was promoted to Commodore and retired that year.

Dyer was the brother of inventor Leonard Dyer and father of composer Susan Hart Dyer.

Authorship
Translated Practical Hints in Regard to West Indian Hurricanes from Spanish in 1885
Wrote The Use of Oil to Lessen the Dangerous Effect of Heavy Seas in 1886
Published an article in National Geographic magazine entitled Geography of the Sea in 1889.

Personal life 
In 1875 Dyer married Susan Hart Palmer. They had three children, George, Susan (Daisy), and Dorothy. Dyer and his family lived in places including Guam and Winter Park, Florida. 

On April 2, 1914, Dyer died in Winter Park, Florida.

References

Governors of Guam
United States Naval Academy alumni
People from Calais, Maine
Writers from Maine
1849 births
1914 deaths